The state controller of California is a constitutional office in the executive branch of the government of the U.S. state of California. Thirty-three individuals have held the office of state controller since statehood. The incumbent is Malia Cohen, a Democrat. The state controller's main office is located at 300 Capitol Mall in Sacramento.

Election and term of office
The state controller assumes office by way of election. The term of office is four years, renewable once. Elections for state controller are held on a four-year basis concurrently with elections for the offices of governor, lieutenant governor, attorney general, secretary of state, state treasurer, insurance commissioner, and superintendent of public instruction.

Powers and duties
As California's chief fiscal officer, the state controller has broad superintending authority over the accounting and disbursement of state and local government finances. As such, the state controller:
 Acts as the state's accountant. This entails maintaining the statewide accounting system, issuing reports on the financial condition of the state, approving claims against the state, administering payroll for state employees, ordering deposits into the state treasury, and drawing checks and approving electronic fund transfers.
 Administers California's unclaimed property laws. As such, the state controller audits holders of unclaimed property, safeguards unclaimed property reported to his or her office, and works to return unclaimed property back to its rightful owners.
 Audits public funds spent by myriad state agencies. The state controller is the internal auditor of California state government, examining the internal controls of state agencies, the state lottery, and oil and gas lease royalties to assure operational effectiveness and efficiency, reliable financial reporting, and legal compliance. A separate state auditor serves as the external auditor for the whole of state government and reports exclusively to the state legislature on state agency financial management and performance.
 Supervises local government finances. As part of this function, the state controller has broad discretion to audit state funds spent by local governments and prescribes uniform accounting, budgeting, and financial reporting systems applicable to nearly 5,000 counties, cities, towns, school districts, local housing authorities, rural development authorities, and all other political subdivisions of the state. Likewise, the state controller reviews the annual financial and single audits performed by external auditors on behalf of California's local governments for conformity with the law and government auditing standards. Separately, the state controller collects, apportions, and distributes property taxes and other state aids among the many counties, cities, towns, and school districts.

Aside from the office's functional responsibilities, the state controller serves on over 70 boards and commissions, including the California State Lands Commission, California State Teachers’ Retirement System, California Public Employees’ Retirement System, California Board of Equalization, California Franchise Tax Board, California Pollution Control Financing Authority, the California Debt Limit Allocation Commission, California Alternative Energy Source Financing Authority, the California Education Facilities Authority, and the California Victim Compensation Board, among others.

Staff
The Office has a staff of Deputy State Controllers that help the State Controller fulfill her elected duties, including sitting on the Board of Equalization and other boards for the State Controller in absentia. Noted former Deputy State Controllers include Barrett McInerney, James Burton, and Laurette Healey.

List of California State Controllers

References

External links 
 

 
1849 establishments in California